Banner is a ghost town in Collyer Township, Trego County, Kansas, United States.

History
Banner was issued a post office in 1879. The post office was discontinued in 1918.

References

Former populated places in Trego County, Kansas
Former populated places in Kansas